Jakob Jonilowicz  (1908–1975) was an Israeli cinematographer.

Jonilowicz was born in Vilna (later Vilnius), Russian Empire. He studied cinematography in Paris.

In 1936 he was the director of photography for the film Yidl Mitn Fidl, Yiddle with his Fiddle.

After the 1939 German invasion of Poland, Jonilowicz returned to his hometown to help his family. After he survived the Holocaust, he was director of photography for Long Is the Road, a German film made in 1947 and 1948. Later he moved to Israel.

Jonilowicz was cinematographer on the following films:
 Tent City – Ir Ha’ohalim, Israel, 1951
 Et La Noce Dansait presented in Cannes Film Festival, 1952
 Break of Day, Israel, 1952–1953
 Transition, US, 1954

In 1961 in Jerusalem, he filmed the trial of Nazi war criminal Adolf Eichmann.

Jonilowicz was married to Dolly Kobryner Jonilowicz, a New York-born film editor who was killed by Germans in occupied Poland during World War II. In 1953, he and his second wife, Hanna, had a daughter in Israel, Tali.

Jonilowicz died in Israel in 1975.

Der Wilner Express

An article published in Vilna, 1936, in the Der Wilner Ekspres (Der Wilner Express) detailed Jakob Jonilowicz' childhood and life before World War II.

References

External links
Jack Jonilowicz in akas.imdb.com 
Jack Jonilowicz in www.citwf.com
Jack Jonilowicz in www.festival-cannes.com
Jack Jonilowicz in www.cine-holocaust.de
Jack Jonilowicz in the film: Idl Mitn Fidl / Jidl Mitn Fidl / Yidl Mitn Fidl / Judel Gra Na Skrzypcach

1908 births
1975 deaths
Soviet emigrants to Israel
Israeli film directors
Polish expatriates in France